Don Gent (27 January 1933 – 2 November 1996) was  a former Australian rules footballer who played with Hawthorn in the Victorian Football League (VFL).

Notes

External links 
		

1933 births
1996 deaths
Australian rules footballers from Victoria (Australia)
Hawthorn Football Club players